Paap Ka Ant  is a 1989 Indian film directed by Vijay Reddy. It stars Govinda, Madhuri Dixit in lead roles, along with Rajesh Khanna, Hema Malini in very very special appearances. The music was composed by Bappi Lahiri.

Cast
Rajesh Khanna as DCP Khanna
Hema Malini as Advocate Jyoti
Govinda as Inspector Arjun
Madhuri Dixit as Nisha
Anupam Kher as Minister Prajapati
Ranjeet as Shakaal
Mac Mohan
Viju Khote
Asrani
Guddi Maruti
Dinesh Hingoo as IG

Plot
A woman fights for justice after her fiancé is killed by criminals who are acquitted for his murder and gangrape of her sister.

Soundtrack 
 "Hum Tum Dance Karenge" - Alka Yagnik, Amit Kumar
 "Ishq Tere Ne" - Kavita Krishnamurthy, Shabbir Kumar
 "Koi Vada Koi Iqrar Na Kiya" - Lata Mangeshkar, Mohammed Aziz
 "Deewane Dil Ke Deewane" - Mohammed Aziz, Kavita Krishnamurthy
 "Zindagi Ne Kiye" - Mohammed Aziz

External links
 

Films scored by Bappi Lahiri
1980s Hindi-language films
1989 films